When We Were Us is the first extended play by South Korean boy band Super Junior-K.R.Y., a sub-unit of Super Junior. The EP is the group's first album since their debut in 2006.

Track listing

Charts

See also
 List of Gaon Album Chart number ones of 2020

References 

2020 EPs
SM Entertainment EPs
Korean-language EPs